Chinatsu Nakayama  is a Japanese voice actress, writer, and politician.

Biography 
Nakayama was born in Kumamoto prefecture, Japan on July 13, 1948. She began acting on stage as a child in 1955, then her family moved to Tokyo with the encouragement of   when Nakayama was 11 years old. She transitioned to television in 1968, hosting a television show called  for eight years. She also appeared on other NHK programs.

Nakayama started writing and becoming politically active in 1970. She was elected to the National Diet in 1980, but lost her re-election campaign in 1986. After leaving the Diet, Nakayama began writing full-time and continued advocating for human rights and against war. Her eight-volume autobiography,  was nominated for the Naoki Prize. She was nominated for the Naoki Prize for two other works as well.

Selected bibliography 

 , 1979

Selected filmography 

 Cleopatra, 1979
 Belladonna of Sadness, 1973
 Jarinko Chie, 1981

References 

1948 births
People from Kumamoto Prefecture
Japanese stage actors
Japanese voice actors
Members of the Diet of Japan
20th-century Japanese writers
Living people